Nikolai Vorobyov may refer to:

Nikolai Vorobyov (politician) (1896–1941), veteran of World War I and World War II, People's Deputy of Ukraine, went missing during fighting near Luhansk
Nikolai Nikolayevich Vorobyov (mathematician) (1925–1955), Soviet and Russian mathematician
Nikolai Vasilievich Vorobyov (born 1960), Russian football coach and former player